Harriet Van Horne (May 17, 1920 – January 15, 1998) was an American newspaper columnist and radio/television critic. She was a writer for many years at the New York World-Telegram and its successors.

Life and career
Van Horne was born in Syracuse, New York, graduated from Newark, New York High School and from the College for Women of the University of Rochester in 1940.

During the 1940s and 1950s, she appeared frequently on television as a celebrity panelist. Van Horne was a regular on NBC's popular series Leave It to the Girls from 1949 to 1954. She was also a regular on the DuMont Television Network's quiz show What's the Story from 1952 to 1955.

She was a syndicated columnist appearing in the New York Post and other newspapers around the country. In 1960 she covered the Nixon-Kennedy debates as a television critic for the Scripps-Howard newspaper chain. Her work landed her on the master list of Nixon political opponents.

Van Horne was also a member of the Peabody Awards Board of Jurors from 1958 to 1967.

Van Horne had to deal with prevailing sexism against female journalists. Ray Erwin of Editor & Publisher described syndicated columnist Van Horne as "a dainty, blue-eyed blonde with a sweet-voiced feminine manner-and a harpoon in her typewriter." In 1972, she published the essay collection Never Go Anywhere Without a Pencil.

According to Van Horne, "I used to enjoy radio until I realised that by listening to it, I had become almost as sterile and unimaginative as the programs themselves." She said that TV review was arduous work, commenting "Imagine having to review 'I Love Lucy' 20 times or 'Gunsmoke' 10 times." In her later years, she said "For all my criticism, I almost enjoyed 'Playhouse 90' compared to the canned shows from Universal or all that cowboy and cop nonsense."

Van Horne continued writing her newspaper column almost up to her death, eventually replacing TV reviews with any random subject that crossed her mind. While her columns remained popular with readers, few newspapers carried them due to the impossibility of categorization.

Personal life
Her husband David Lowe (1913–1965) was a television producer.

Death
Van Horne died of breast cancer at New York Hospital in Manhattan on January 15, 1998. She was 77.

References

External links
 

1920 births
1998 deaths
20th-century American non-fiction writers
20th-century American women writers
American columnists
American television critics
American women columnists
Deaths from breast cancer
Deaths from cancer in New York (state)
Journalists from New York City
University of Rochester alumni
Writers from Syracuse, New York